Kilpyavr  may refer to:
Kilpyavr (rural locality), a rural locality in Murmansk Oblast, Russia
Kilpyavr (air base), a military air base in Murmansk Oblast, Russia